John Mathieson  (1855, Durness, Sutherland – 14 June 1945, Edinburgh) was a Scottish surveyor, cartographer, explorer and Gaelic scholar.

In 1909, Mathieson retired from his post as Division Superintendent of HM Ordnance Survey in order to serve as chief surveyor on the Scottish scientific expedition to Svalbard, led by William Speirs Bruce.

In 1920-21 he led the surveying party on Prins Karls Forland, largely completing Bruce's survey.

On 7 March 1921 he was elected a Fellow of the Royal Society of Edinburgh, upon the nomination of John Horne, John Flett, Thomas Jehu, Ben Peach, Robert Campbell and Thomas Cuthbert Day.

In 1927 he was awarded the Gold Medal of the Royal Scottish Geographical Society and the Murchison Grant by the Royal Geographical Society.

Works

"General Wade and His Military Roads in the Highlands of Scotland", Scottish Geographical Magazine, Volume 40, 1924

"St Kilda", Scottish Geographical Magazine, Volume 44, December 1928

"The Story of Antarctic Exploration 1716-1931", 1932
"The Story of Arctic Voyages and Explorations", 1934
"The Tragedy of the Scottish Highlands", Scottish Geographical Magazine, Volume 54, 1938

"Scottish Ghost-names and other place names: Some of the Difficulties in ascertaining their Meaning", Scottish Geographical Magazine, Volume 60, 1944

References

External links
 Map of St Kilda

1855 births
1945 deaths
20th-century explorers
People from Sutherland
Fellows of the Royal Society of Edinburgh
Scottish geographers
Scottish surveyors
Scottish cartographers
Scottish polar explorers
Explorers of Svalbard
20th-century Scottish historians
Historians of Scotland
Toponymists